Wilson School is a historic school building located at Mannington in Marion County, West Virginia, United States.  It was built in 1912, and is a two-story, rectangular brick building with a raised basement. The symmetrical building has a flat roof and crenellated parapet with Collegiate Gothic detailing. The school closed in 1979, and is now occupied by the West Augusta Historical Society Museum.  Other museum-related attractions on the property are the Price Log House (c. 1850) and a B&O Railroad Caboose (1912).

It was listed on the National Register of Historic Places in 2001.

References

External links
West Augusta Historical Society Museum information

Collegiate Gothic architecture in West Virginia
Defunct schools in West Virginia
Educational institutions disestablished in 1979
Former school buildings in the United States
History museums in West Virginia
Museums in Marion County, West Virginia
Educational institutions established in 1912
Schools in Marion County, West Virginia
School buildings on the National Register of Historic Places in West Virginia
National Register of Historic Places in Marion County, West Virginia
U.S. Route 250
1912 establishments in West Virginia